Glen Mona Railway Station (Manx: Stashoon Raad Yiarn Ghlion Shuin) is an intermediate stopping place on the northerly section of the Manx Electric Railway on the Isle of Man.

Location
The stop serves the nearby village of the same name which boasts its own filling station, public house and primitive chapel, known as "Ballagory" and is situated on the main road between Laxey and Ramsey on the Isle of Man.  The station is a short distance from the main road to which the railway runs parallel for this section.

Facilities
The stop has its own wooden waiting shelter, constructed in 1985 to replace the extant corrugated iron version.

Route

Also
Manx Electric Railway Stations

References

Sources
 Manx Electric Railway Stopping Places (2002) Manx Electric Railway Society
 Island Images: Manx Electric Railway Pages (2003) Jon Wornham
 Official Tourist Department Page (2009) Isle Of Man Heritage Railways

Railway stations in the Isle of Man
Manx Electric Railway
Railway stations opened in 1899